Comstock Northwest is a census-designated place (CDP) in Kalamazoo County in the U.S. state of Michigan. The population was 5,455 at the 2010 census, up from 4,472 at the 2000 census.

Geography
The CDP is in the northwest portion of Comstock Charter Township, just northeast of Kalamazoo. It also includes a small sliver of land in northeast Kalamazoo Charter Township between the city of Kalamazoo and Comstock Charter Township. The CDP is bordered to the west by Kalamazoo and to the southwest by unincorporated Eastwood.

M-343 is the main highway through the community. It leads southwest  to the center of Kalamazoo and northeast  to Richland.

Demographics

As of the census of 2000, there were 4,472 people, 1,965 households, and 1,208 families residing in the CDP. The racial makeup of the CDP was 87.81% White, 7.51% African American, 0.27% Native American, 1.65% Asian, 0.96% from other races, and 1.79% from two or more races. Hispanic or Latino of any race were 2.10% of the population.

There were 1,965 households, out of which 28.7% had children under the age of 18 living with them, 47.3% were married couples living together, 10.4% had a female householder with no husband present, and 38.5% were non-families. 32.4% of all households were made up of individuals, and 8.9% had someone living alone who was 65 years of age or older.  The average household size was 2.27 and the average family size was 2.88.

In the CDP, the population was spread out, with 23.9% under the age of 18, 10.1% from 18 to 24, 30.4% from 25 to 44, 20.8% from 45 to 64, and 14.7% who were 65 years of age or older.  The median age was 35 years. For every 100 females, there were 95.5 males.  For every 100 females age 18 and over, there were 91.1 males.

The median income for a household in the CDP was $43,590, and the median income for a family was $56,115. Males had a median income of $41,698 versus $31,713 for females. The per capita income for the CDP was $23,961.  About 5.3% of families and 6.1% of the population were below the poverty line, including 9.0% of those under age 18 and 3.4% of those age 65 or over.

References

Unincorporated communities in Kalamazoo County, Michigan
Census-designated places in Michigan
Kalamazoo–Portage metropolitan area
Unincorporated communities in Michigan
Census-designated places in Kalamazoo County, Michigan